Tōltēcatl (Nahuatl for "the Toltec" or "the artisan")  means skilled craftsman or artisan.

References 

Aztec pulque gods
Alcohol deities